Narciso Malatesta (Venice, October 26, 1835 – Cilla Rometta near Sassuolo, September 26, 1896) was an Italian painter, active in Modena, mainly depicting historical and sacred subjects in a Realist style.

Biography

He was the son of the painter Adeodato Malatesta. Narciso first studied at the Modenese Academy of Fine Arts. After studying in Modena, he traveled to Florence. In 1860, he married Adele Mari, daughter of a deputy to Parliament, Adriano Mari; their son, Baccio, would become director of the Gazzettino artistico letterario of Florence. Among his works are Il Falconiere (Pinacoteca Brera, Milan); Il Numismatico (Academy of Fine Arts of Modena); Il Varchi che legge le Storie a Cosimo de' Medici (Galleria d'arte moderna, Florence); Carlo d' Angiò che visita lo studio di Cimabue; Dante che riceve Boccaccio; La moneta antica; La famiglia del disertore; L' aia di Mileto che ritrae Giulio Cesare; and La famiglia del saltimbanco. Malatesta was professor of design, photography, and topography at the Scuola militare of Modena.

References

19th-century Italian painters
Italian male painters
1835 births
1896 deaths
Painters from Modena
19th-century Italian male artists